V58 or V-58 may refer to:

A U.S. Department of Defense LPC-10 algorithm used to encode voice in the ANDVT
Air route V58 near Boston
An art gallery in Mejlen in Aarhus, Denmark
CR V58 a road in Howard County, Iowa
V58 a code in ICD-9 meaning "Encounter for other and unspecified procedures and aftercare"
Princess V58, a luxury yacht
The Vestergade 58
A series of trams used in Bucharest by CTP Iași
 Vanadium-58 (V-58 or 58V), an isotope of vanadium